Bekasi Station (BKS) is a railway station located in Marga Mulya, North Bekasi, Bekasi, West Java. The station is at an altitude of +19 meters above sea level. This station serves KRL Commuterline and intercity trains.

History 
In March 1887, the Batavia–Bekasi section of the railway line was completed by the Bataviasche Oosterspoorweg Maatschappij (BOS). At first, BOS decided to build a railway line from Batavia to Karawang, but what materialized was Batavia–Kedunggedeh (to the west of Karawang). This company had experienced debt problems, so the Staatsspoorwegen chose to purchase the BOS line in 1898. With the purchase of this line, the stations on this line were also improved, namely by replacing the station building with a more permanent building that still carried the Indische style—like the other stations on the SS line at that time—and the line was extended to Karawang, then Cikampek on 27 December 1902.

Bekasi Station is a silent witness to historical events on the banks of the Bekasi River. From this station, Japanese soldier prisoner were tortured in the river on 19 October 1945. The Japanese naval officer, Rear Admiral Maeda, did not accept the torture, but eventually forgave it. To commemorate this historic event, the Kali Bekasi Memorial Monument was established.

To support the operation of the Jabotabek KRL in Bekasi, Perumka built an overhead line substation in September–November 1992. Since then, the Jabotabek KRL began to operate on this line.

Building and layout 
Bekasi Station initially had five railway lines with lines 1 and 4 being straight tracks similar to Depok Station plus lanes for loading and unloading coal transport on the southwest side of the emplacement. 

The construction of the Manggarai–Cikarang quadruple-track railway section was carried out so that the main railway line increased to four. This is done so that the KRL Commuterline, freight trains, and non-KRL passengers will not be disturbed by each other.

In connection with the construction of the quadruple-track railway, PT KAI, KCI (now KAI Commuter), Bekasi City Government, and the Directorate General of Railways decided to renovate this station. In addition, the track layout at this station was overhauled. The new station building carries a modern minimalist concept and is made into a multilevel station like other stations on the Cikarang–Klender route. The characteristics of the Staatsspoorwegen heritage station building are no longer visible due to the impact of the renovations carried out. When the construction of the new station on the south side was completed, the land that used to be the loading and unloading lane for coal transport at this station has been converted into an additional line emplacement for KRL Commuterline and temporarily decommissioned lines 1-3 to continue the construction of the new station building on the north side.

After the construction of the new station on the north side has been completed and the Cakung–Bekasi quadruple-track railway is operational in mid-December 2022, the number of lines at this station will increase to eight. Line 2 is used as a straight track for non-KRL trains heading to Jatinegara, line 3 is used as a straight track for non-KRL trains heading for Cikarang–Cikampek, line 5 is used as a straight line for KRL Commuterline towards Jatinegara, and line 6 is used as a straight line for KRL Commuterline towards Cikarang. Lines 1-3 are used for long-distance passenger train stops, line 4 can be used for long-distance passenger train stops and KRL, lines 5-7 are used for KRL, and line 8 is for train chain parking. The quadruple-track railway line ends to the east of the station, to be precise at a level crossing to the east of the Bekasi River Bridge. 

This building has an area of 3,600 m² equipped with praying rooms, toilets, escalators and elevators.

Services
The following is a list of train services at the Bekasi Station.

Passenger services

Kereta Api Indonesia
 Executive class
 Argo Bromo Anggrek (night schedule), towards  and towards  (available executive train type luxury)
 Argo Muria, towards 
 Argo Parahyangan, towards  and towards  (available executive train type luxury)
 Bima, towards  and towards 
 Sembrani, towards  and towards  (available executive train type luxury)
 Taksaka, towards  (night schedule, available executive train type luxury)
 Purwojaya, towards 
Mixed class
 Argo Parahyangan, towards  and towards Bandung ( or ) (executive-economy)
 Argo Cheribon, towards  and towards -
 Singasari, towards  and towards  (executive-economy)
 Gaya Baru Malam Selatan, towards  (executive-economy)
 Jayabaya, towards  (executive-economy)
 Brantas, towards  (executive-economy-business)
 Gumarang, towards  (executive-business)
 Senja Utama Solo, towards  (executive-economy-business)
 Mataram, towards  (executive-business)
 Gajah Wong, towards  (executive-economy)
 Senja Utama Yogya, towards  (executive-economy)
 Sawunggalih, towards  (executive-economy)
 Pangandaran, towards  (executive-economy)
 Kertajaya, towards  (business-economy)
Economy class
 Jayakarta, towards  and towards 
 Kertajaya, towards  and towards 
 Kutojaya Utara, towards  and towards 
 Tawang Jaya, towards 
 Menoreh, towards  and towards 
 Matarmaja, towards  and towards 
 Bengawan, towards  and towards 
 Progo, towards 
 Serayu, towards  and towards 
 Tegal Ekspres, towards  and towards

KAI Commuter
  Cikarang Loop Line (Full Racket)
  Cikarang Loop Line (Half Racket), to / (via  and ) and

Freight services

Supporting transportation

Gallery

References

External links

Bekasi
Railway stations in West Java
railway stations opened in 1887